José Álvarez Junco (born 1942) is a Spanish historian, emeritus professor of the History of Thought and Political and Social Movements at the Complutense University of Madrid (UCM). He is an expert in the study of the nation-building of Spain, nationalisms and the anarchist movement.

Biography 
Born on 8 November 1942 in Vielha, in the Catalan Pyrenees, he moved young with his family to Villalpando (province of Zamora), where he was raised and spent his youth.

He studied law (1959–1964) and political science (1962–1965) at the University of Madrid. A pupil of Luis Díez del Corral and José Antonio Maravall during his university years, he earned a PhD at the UCM reading a thesis on the Spanish anarchist movement supervised by Maravall.

From 1992 to 2000, he held the Prince of Asturias endowed chair at Tufts University. He was also the Chair of the Iberian Study Group at the Harvard University's Minda de Gunzburg Center for European Studies (CES).

From 2004 to 2008 he was Director of the Centre for Political and Constitutional Studies (CEPC) in Madrid, serving in that capacity as member of the Council of State.

Chair of History of Thought and Political and Social Movements at the UCM, he retired in 2014.

Works 

Author

References 
Informational Notes

Citations

Bibliography
 
 
 
 
 
 
 

20th-century Spanish historians
Tufts University faculty
Academic staff of the Complutense University of Madrid
Historians of political thought
1942 births
Scholars of nationalism
Living people
Historians of the labour movement in Spain
21st-century Spanish historians